Alexander Ramsay may refer to:

 Sir Alexander Ramsay, 5th Baronet, MP for Kincardineshire, 1713–1715
 Sir Alexander Ramsay, 2nd Baronet, MP for Kincardineshire, 1820–1826
 Sir Alexander Ramsay, 3rd Baronet, Liberal MP for Rochdale, 1857–1859
 Sir Alexander Ramsay of Dalhousie (died 1342), captor of Roxburgh Castle in 1342
 Sir Alexander Ramsay (Royal Navy officer) (1881–1972), British admiral
 Captain Alexander Ramsay of Mar (1919–2000)
 Alexander Ramsay (architect) (c. 1777–1847), Scottish builder and architect
 Alexander Ramsay (anatomist) (1754–1824), Scottish anatomist and physician
 Alexander Ramsay (Australian politician) (1863–1925), member of the Victorian Legislative Assembly
 Alexander Ramsay (West Bromwich MP) (1887–1969), British Conservative Party politician, Member of Parliament, 1931–1935

 Alexander Maurice Ramsay (1914–1978), General Manager of the South Australian Housing Trust
Alex Ramsay (1899–1957), English footballer

See also
 Alexander Ramsey (1815–1903), American politician
 Alexander Ramsey (footballer) (1867–1942), English footballer